The Lighthouse Point Light is an active lighthouse in Beaver Harbour, New Brunswick on Drews Head, as it was known, on the western side of the bay.

History
In 1915 a fourth-order lens was set up and in the 1960s a new metal square pyramidal skeletal tower was built to substitute the older.

The current lighthouse was erected in 1984 and consist of a  fiberglass cylindrical tower with balcony and lantern. The lighthouse is completely automated and managed by the Canadian Coast Guard with the identification code number CCG 83.

Keepers
 Ezra Munro (1875 – 1882)
 Edward Dukes Snell (1882 – 1892)
 John C. Conley (1892 – 1904)
 John "Melvin" Eldridge (1904 – 1926)
 Roy A. Sparks (1928 – at least 1939)
 Hazen Holmes (1952 – 1957)
 Garnett William Eldridge (1957 – 1967)
 Edward N. Wilson (1967 – 1970)
 C.A. Stuart (1970 – 1983)
 R.C. Stuart (1983 – 1984)

See also
 List of lighthouses in New Brunswick
 List of lighthouses in Canada

References

External links
 Canadian Coast Guard: Aids to Navigation

Lighthouses in New Brunswick
Lighthouses completed in 1875
1875 establishments in New Brunswick